220 is the third extended play by American rapper Snoop Dogg. The EP was released on February 20, 2018, by Doggystyle Records and Empire Distribution.  It features guest appearances from Jacquees, Dreezy, LunchMoney Lewis, Hypnotic Brass Ensemble, and frequent collaborators Kokane, Goldie Loc, and October London.

Background
Snoop Dogg announced the EP and its release date on February 19, 2018. The album's lead single, "Everything", was released on February 9, 2018.

Critical response

220 received a positive rating from music critic Phillip Mlynar of HotNewHipHop. He said that "While perhaps not as hungry as he was during his prime, Snoop Dogg has aged gracefully, owning his role as hip-hop's favorite uncle. Lyrically, he's still the same Snoop we all know and love; the iconic voice and infectious charisma never left."

Track listing
Credits adapted from Tidal.
 Tracks produced by My Guy Mars, Dr. Evo, October London & Ben Billions.

References

2018 EPs
Snoop Dogg albums
Empire Distribution EPs
EPs by American artists